"Never Thought (That I Could Love)" is a song by Canadian singer-songwriter Dan Hill, released as a single in 1987. It was the second single released from his eponymous eighth studio album, Dan Hill. In Canada, the song reached No. 22 and No. 1 on its Adult Contemporary chart. In the U.S., it reached No. 43 on the Billboard Hot 100 and No. 2 on the Adult Contemporary chart.

Chart performance

References

1987 songs
1987 singles
Dan Hill songs
Songs written by Dan Hill
Columbia Records singles